Piano Works is the third album of Craig Armstrong, containing solo piano pieces from different soundtracks played by himself.

Track listing

References

2004 classical albums
Craig Armstrong (composer) albums